The 1954–55 FAW Welsh Cup is the 68th season of the annual knockout tournament for competitive football teams in Wales.

Key
League name pointed after clubs name.
FL D1 - Football League First Division
FL D3N - Football League Third Division North
FL D3S - Football League Third Division South
SFL - Southern Football League
WLN - Welsh League North

Fifth round
Ten winners from the Fourth round and six new clubs.

Sixth round

Semifinal
Barry Town and Wrexham played at Cardiff, Cardiff City and Chester played at Wrexham.

Final
Final were held at Wrexham, replay - at Cardiff.

External links
The FAW Welsh Cup

1954-55
Wales
Cup